Lanthanum ytterbium oxide is a solid inorganic compound of lanthanum, ytterbium and oxygen with the chemical formula of LaYbO3. This compound adopts the Perovskite structure.

Synthesis
LaYbO3 is not a naturally occurring mineral but it can prepared by solid state reaction between La2O3 and Yb2O3 at temperatures around 1200 °C. Single-crystals of LaYbO3 can also be grown of a molten hydroxide flux at 750 °C in sealed silver tubes. Thin films of LaYbO3 have also been fabricated by pulsed laser deposition.

Structure

LaYbO3 and other LaREO3 oxides (where RE=Ho, Y, Er, Tm, Yb, and Lu) compounds have an orthorhombic crystal structure with an internal symmetry described by the Pnma space group. The structure can be described by slightly distorted YbO6 octahedra tilted in the a−b+a− configuration according to Glazer's notation and antiparallel displaced La3+ ions. The rotation of the YbO6 octahedra reduces the coordination number of the La from 12 to 8.
It exhibits exhibit a negative thermal expansion along the a and b axes.

Physical Properties
LaYbO3 exhibits a room-temperature permittivity, ɛr, of ∼26, which decreases slightly to 25 at 10 K. LaYbO3 shows antiferromagnetic ordering with a weak ferromagnetism at 2.7 K. LaYbO3-based perovskites are also known to show proton conductivity at intermediate temperatures (600-800 °C).

References

Lanthanum compounds
Ceramic materials
Perovskites
Ytterbium compounds
Oxides